Ayanda Denge (died 24 March 2019) was a South African trans woman and sex trafficking survivor. She was an advocate for transgender people, sex trafficking survivors, and for the abolition of prostitution. She was the chairperson of the Sex Workers Education and Advocacy Taskforce (SWEAT). Denge has said that, "being transgender is ... a triple dose of stigmatisation and discrimination".

Early life
Denge was Xhosa, and grew up in the city of Port Elizabeth, in the Eastern Cape in South Africa.

Career
Denge began work in Johannesburg, and later travelled to other southern African cities including Harare, Durban, Cape Town, Port Elizabeth, and Victoria Falls. She was a sex worker for over 15 years.

Denge worked as outreach co-ordinator for the Sisonke Sex Worker Movement (Sisonke) for two years.

Denge was the chairperson of the Sex Workers Education and Advocacy Taskforce (SWEAT). She was an advocate for transgender people, sex workers, and for the decriminalisation of sex work. In her role with SWEAT, Denge trained 50 peer educators, and worked as a motivational speaker on "cancer awareness, HIV/AIDS awareness, and human rights advocacy issues related to sex work". She also worked on the project "Integrate – HIV/AIDS Reduction for Sex Workers" at the TB/HIV CARE Association. She advocated for the rights of people living with HIV, and was a member of SistazHood, the female transgender sex worker human rights, health, and support group at SWEAT.

Denge led SWEAT through the August 2015 launch in Cape Town of the Asijiki Coalition for the Decriminalisation of Sex Work, where she delivered a speech. The organisation includes sex workers, activists, and advocates and defenders of human rights, and the steering committee consists of the Sisonke Sex Worker Movement (Sisonke), the Women's Legal Centre (WLC), the Sex Worker Education and Advocacy Taskforce (SWEAT), and Sonke Gender Justice. The organization aims through decriminalization to reduce the vulnerability of sex workers to violence and illness, and increase their access to labor, health, and justice services.

Denge was interviewed by the Daily Vox while attending the 2016 International AIDS Conference in Durban, "Being transgender is not a double dose, but it's a triple dose of stigmatisation and discrimination. You are discriminated against for your sexual identity, you are discriminated against for your work, and you are discriminated against of your HIV status." She spoke out also against emotional abuse and police brutality, noting that the police confiscated sex workers' condoms.

Personal life
Denge lived in Cape Town, South Africa. She lived on the street for a period before moving into the Helen Bowden Nurses' Home in Green Point. The former nurses' home is owned by the provincial government, but had been unlawfully occupied by tenants' group Reclaim the City, which campaigns for affordable housing, and renamed the Ahmed Kathrada House. In February 2019, she had been elected a house leader.

Death 
Denge was murdered in her own room on the 24th of March 2019. She was stabbed and left laying on her floor. It was reported that Denge’s room was locked with a padlock from the outside and it was only when a leader at the residence peeped through the window out of concern for her well-being that anyone noticed her body on the floor. The electricity had been cut, causing the building to be completely dark at night. She had been living with someone, who disappeared after the killing.

References

Year of birth missing
2019 deaths
South African LGBT rights activists
South African transgender people
South African activists
South African women activists
South African women's rights activists
Transgender women
Xhosa people
Women civil rights activists
21st-century South African LGBT people